A Chicago fitting (also called a Duck's foot fitting due to its shape) is a one quarter turn fitting used for attaching hoses or piping together. Chicago's fittings are used on both low to medium pressure gas and fluid lines. The advantages of the Chicago fitting are that it can be used in a wide range of industries and that there is no male or female fitting; both fittings are identical.

See also
 Gladhand connector

References

External links
 Universal “Chicago” Couplings

Plumbing